Écouen is a commune in the Val-d'Oise department, in the northern suburbs of Paris, France. The 19th-century poet and playwright Pierre-Joseph Charrin (1784–1863) died in Écouen. The artist Louis Théophile Hingre lived and worked in Écouen.

Écouen houses the Château d'Écouen, home of the Montmorency family. This château, built during the Renaissance, houses the Musée national de la Renaissance, the largest Renaissance museum in France.

Population

Transport
Écouen is served by Écouen – Ézanville station on the Transilien Paris – Nord suburban rail line. This station is located at the border between the commune of Écouen and the commune of Ézanville, on the Ézanville side of the border.

See also
Communes of the Val-d'Oise department

References

External links
Tourism office board 

Association of Mayors of the Val d'Oise 
Musée National de la Renaissance 

Communes of Val-d'Oise